Lyons Township is one of 29 townships in Cook County, Illinois. As of the 2010 census, its population was 111,688, with its most populous municipalities including La Grange (pop. 15,550), Justice (pop. 12,926) and Summit (pop. 11,054). Lyons Township was established in 1850. The village of Lyons, almost all of which lies within the township, is often confused with it.

The township hall is located at 6404 S. Joliet Road in Countryside. Other township municipalities include Indian Head Park, Hodgkins and McCook, as well as major portions of Western Springs, Brookfield, Bridgeview, Burr Ridge and Willow Springs. Lyons Township's approximate borders are Harlem Avenue (Illinois Route 43) on the east, the line of 39th Street (Southview Avenue, Brewster Avenue) on the north, the DuPage County boundary (County Line Road) on the west, and the line of 87th Street on the south, except west of Willow Springs, where it follows the Des Plaines River to the DuPage county line. The Chicago Sanitary and Ship Canal, designated a National Historic District in 2011, passes through the township from southwest to northeast.

Geography

Borders
Lyons Township is bordered on the north by Proviso and Riverside Townships, on the east by Stickney Township and the Chicago communities of Garfield Ridge and Clearing, on the south by Palos Township, and on the west by Downers Grove Township in DuPage County.

Cities, towns, villages
There are seventeen municipalities completely or partially within Lyons Township's thirty-seven square miles of territory:

Bedford Park (the half west of Harlem Avenue)
Bridgeview (the half northwest of 87th Street and Harlem)
Brookfield (the third south of Southview Avenue)
Burr Ridge (the eastern half in Cook County)
Countryside
Hickory Hills (the small portion north of 87th Street)
Hinsdale (the small portion in Cook County)
Hodgkins
Indian Head Park
Justice
La Grange
Lyons (all but the small portion north of 39th Street)
McCook
Riverside (the small portion south of 39th Street)
Summit
Western Springs (all but the small portion north of 39th Street)
Willow Springs (all but the area south of 87th Street and the Des Plaines River)

Unincorporated Towns
Gary at 
La Grange Highlands at 
Nottingham Park at

Extinct Towns
Argo at 
Tiedtville at

Adjacent townships
 Proviso Township (north)
 Riverside Township (north northeast)
 Berwyn Township (northeast)
 Stickney Township (east northeast and east southeast)
 Worth Township (southeast)
 Palos Township (south)
 Lemont Township (southwest)
 Downers Grove Township, DuPage County (west)
 York Township, DuPage County (northwest)

Cemeteries
The township contains these seven cemeteries: Archer Woods Memorial Park, Bethania, LaGrange, Lithuanian National, Resurrection, Saint Johns and Lyonsville.

Major highways
  Interstate 55
  Interstate 294
  U.S. Route 12
  U.S. Route 20
  U.S. Route 34
  U.S. Route 45
  U.S. Route 66
  Illinois Route 43
  Illinois Route 171

Airports and landing strips
 La Grange Memorial Hospital Heliport
 Pielet Summit Heliport

Rivers
 Des Plaines River

Landmarks
 Arie Crown Forest Preserve
 Buffalo Woods (Cook County Forest Preserves)
 Columbia Woods (Cook County Forest Preserves)
 Chicago Portage National Historic Site
 Emmanuel Episcopal Church
 First Congregational Church of Western Springs
 George E. Purple House
 Hofmann Tower
 La Grange Village Historic District
 Lyons Township Hall
 Robert Vial House
 Western Springs Water Tower

Demographics

As of the 2010 census:
 White: 82.1% (Non-Hispanic: 71.7%)
 Black: 6.0%
 American Indian and Alaska Native: 0.3%
 Asian: 2.2%
 Native Hawaiian and Other Pacific Islander: 0.02%
 Some other race: 7.3%
 Two or more races: 2.1%
 Hispanic or Latino (any race): 19.0%

Elected officials
 Christopher Getty - Supervisor
 Mary Jo Noonan - Clerk
 Barbara M. Weyrick - Assessor
 Sean McDermott - Highway Commissioner
 Michael A. Porfirio - Trustee
 Tom Garrette - Trustee
 Colleen H. Kelly - Trustee
 Timothy M. Sprague - Trustee

Education
Lyons Township is served by two public high school districts: Lyons Township High School District 204, for students in the northwest half of the township, and Argo Community High School District 217, for students in the southeast half.

See also
Resurrection Mary

References
 
 "Pamphlet For Public Information" published by Lyons Township Clerk Robert S. Berliner, 1968.
 United States Census Bureau 2007 TIGER/Line Shapefiles
 United States National Atlas

External links
 Lyons Township official website
 US Census
 City-data.com
 Lyons Township Information Center
 Cook County official site

Townships in Cook County, Illinois
Populated places established in 1850
Townships in Illinois